László Kubala (10 June 1927 – 17 May 2002) was a Hungarian professional footballer who also had Spanish citizenship. He played as a forward for Ferencváros, Slovan Bratislava, Barcelona, and Espanyol, among other clubs. Regarded as one of the best players in history, Kubala is considered a hero of FC Barcelona. A Hungarian national by birth, he also held Czechoslovak and Spanish citizenship, and played for the national teams of all three countries.

Kubala was noted for his quick and skilful dribbling, composed and powerful finishing, and accuracy from free kicks. During the 1950s, he was a leading member of the successful Barcelona team, scoring 280 goals in 345 appearances. During the club's 1999 centenary celebrations, a fan's poll declared Kubala the best player ever to play for the Spanish club. After retiring as a player, he had two spells as coach of Barcelona and also coached both Spain's senior national team and Olympic team.

Early life and career

Childhood and youth
Kubala was born in Budapest, as were his parents, who came from mixed backgrounds. His mother, Anna Stecz, a factory worker, had Polish, Slovak and Hungarian roots, while his father, Pál Kubala Kurjas, a bricklayer, belonged to the Slovak minority of Hungary. Kubala described himself as a "cosmopolitan". He began his career as a junior player with Ganz TE, a factory team that played in the Hungarian third division. At the age of 11, he was playing in teams with other players who were three to five years older. At the age of 18, he signed for Ferencvárosi TC where he was a teammate of Sándor Kocsis. In 1946, Kubala moved to Czechoslovakia, allegedly to avoid military service, and joined ŠK Slovan Bratislava. In 1947, he married Anna Viola Daučíkova, the sister of the Czechoslovakian national coach, Ferdinand Daučík. In 1948, Kubala returned to Hungary, again to allegedly avoid military service, and joined Vasas SC.

Refugee 
In January 1949, as Hungary was occupied by the Soviet Union and became a communist satellite state, Kubala fled the country in the back of a truck. Initially, he arrived in the United States zone of Allied-occupied Austria and then moved on to Italy, where he played briefly for Pro Patria. In May 1949, he also agreed to play for Torino in a testimonial against S.L. Benfica but pulled out after his son became ill. On the way back from Lisbon, the plane carrying the Torino team crashed into the Superga hills, killing all 31 people on board.

Meanwhile, the Hungarian Football Federation accused Kubala of breach of contract, leaving the country without permission, and failure to do military service. FIFA backed them and imposed a one-year international ban. In January 1950, Kubala, with Ferdinand Daučík as coach, formed his own team, Hungaria, which was made up of fellow refugees fleeing Eastern Europe. In the summer of 1950, the team arrived in Spain to play a series of friendlies against a Madrid XI, a Spain XI and RCD Espanyol. They also played a friendly game against the legendary Millonarios FC lead by Alfredo Di Stéfano.

During these games, Kubala was spotted by both Real Madrid and Josep Samitier, then chief scout at FC Barcelona. Kubala was offered a contract by Real but was persuaded by Samitier to sign for Barcelona. Samitier used his connections within the government of Francisco Franco to help arrange the transfer. Franco's government wanted to utilize Kubala's status as a refugee from one of the USSR's satellite countries to reinforce the regime's validity, thus helping Kubala obtain Spanish citizenship without delay. In the midst of the Cold War, Kubala's escape to the West was used as propaganda by Franco's government and was made into a successful film, The Stars Search for Peace, which saw Kubala and Samitier playing themselves.

FC Barcelona
Kubala signed for FC Barcelona on 15 June 1950, and as part of the deal, Ferdinand Daučík also became the Barcelona coach. However, the ban imposed on Kubala was still in place and he did not make his La Liga debut until 1951. He was permitted to play friendlies, and in two consecutive games against Frankfurter S.V., which FC Barcelona won 4–1 and 10–4, he scored six goals and assisted another five. He also played in the Copa del Generalísimo and helped the club win the trophy in 1951.

In his first La Liga season, 1951–52, Kubala scored 26 goals in 19 games. This included 7 goals in a 9–0 win over Sporting de Gijón, five against Celta de Vigo and hat-tricks against Sevilla and Racing de Santander. His seven goals against Gijón remain the record for most goals scored in a single match in La Liga. He also scored in the Copa del Generalísimo final as Barcelona beat Valencia 4–2. This season proved to be one of the club's most successful. Coach Daučík and Kubala, together with players like Emilio Aldecoa, Velasco, Joan Segarra and Ramallets, inspired the team to win five trophies, including La Liga, the Copa del Generalísimo, the Latin Cup, and the Copa Eva Duarte. Kubala missed much of the 1952–53 season after contracting tuberculosis, which threatened to end his playing career. However, he made a miraculous recovery and returned to help Barcelona retain both La Liga and the Copa del Generalísimo. He also scored again in the Copa final win, a 2–1 win over Athletic Bilbao. During his time with Barcelona, he scored a total of 14 hat-tricks.

In 1958, Kubala persuaded two fellow Hungarian refugees Sándor Kocsis and Zoltán Czibor to join him at Barcelona. Together with a young Luis Suárez and Evaristo, they formed the nucleus of the team that won a La Liga / Copa del Generalísimo double in 1959 and a La Liga / Fairs Cup double in 1960. However, Kubala found himself out of favour with coach Helenio Herrera and lost his place in the team. As a result, he missed the 1960 European Cup semi-final against Real Madrid which Barcelona lost 6–2 on aggregate. The result saw Herrera lose his job and Kubala restored to the team. In the 1961 European Cup, Barcelona became the first club to beat Real Madrid in the competition. Inspired by Kubala they won 4–3 on aggregate and subsequently reached the final where they lost to Benfica 2–3. Kubala briefly retired as a player in 1961 and initially became a youth coach at Barcelona, before becoming coach of the senior team for the 1962–63 season. However, after losing a Fairs Cup game to Red Star Belgrade, he was dismissed. In the summer of 1963, he played abroad in the Eastern Canada Professional Soccer League with Toronto City.

International career 

Kubala played for three international teams – Czechoslovakia, Hungary and Spain. While playing with ŠK Slovan Bratislava, he appeared in six games and scored four goals for Czechoslovakia between 1946 and 1947. After returning to Budapest in 1948, he played three games for Hungary but failed to score. After adopting Spanish nationality, Kubala played 19 times and scored 11 goals for Spain between 1953 and 1961, being one of a small group to have played for the country having been born elsewhere. The highlight of his international career was a hat-trick for Spain against Turkey in 3–0 win in November 1957. Despite playing for three countries, Kubala never played in the finals of a major international tournament. He was included in the Spain squad for the 1962 World Cup but, along with Alfredo Di Stéfano, did not play due to injury.

As well as playing for three international teams, Kubala also played for both a Europe XI and the Catalan XI. On 21 October 1953, England played a Europe XI at Wembley Stadium to celebrate the 90th anniversary of the Football Association and Kubala scored twice in the 4–4 draw. He also played four games and scored four times for the Catalan XI. On 26 January 1955, in a game against Bologna at Les Corts, he was joined by guest player Alfredo Di Stéfano; the Catalan XI won 6–2 with two goals from Kubala and one from Di Stéfano. His last game for the Catalan XI was his own testimonial on 4 March 1993 at the Montjuïc Stadium against an International XI. He played the opening ten minutes of the game at age 65.

Coaching career 
After leaving Barcelona, Kubala accepted a contract as a player-coach with RCD Espanyol and teamed up with Alfredo Di Stéfano. During his time at Espanyol he gave a La Liga debut to his son, Branko. In 1966, he joined FC Zürich, again as player-coach, and made his last appearance in a European Cup game against the competition's eventual winners, Celtic. In 1967, Kubala went to Canada, where at Toronto Falcons he enjoyed something of family reunion with his father-in-law, Ferdinand Daučík, his brother-in-law, Yanko Daucik and his son Branko. He appeared in 19 matches for Toronto, scoring five times.

By the end of 1968, he had returned to La Liga, and after a brief spell at Córdoba CF, he became coach of the Spain national team. Kubala ended the team's 11-year absence from the World Cup when he guided the team to the 1978 World Cup, but could not steer them through the first-round group stage. He also managed them at Euro 80, where they were again eliminated in the first round.

In 1980, he returned to Barcelona as a manager for a second short spell before moving to Saudi Arabia where he managed Al-Hilal. He subsequently managed three other La Liga clubs, including CD Málaga whom he guided to the Segunda División title in 1988. His last coaching position was with Paraguay in 1995.

Career statistics

Club

International

Honours

Player

Barcelona

La Liga: 1951–52, 1952–53, 1958–59, 1959–60
Copa del Generalísimo: 1951, 1952, 1953, 1957, 1959
Inter-Cities Fairs Cup: 1955–58, 1958–60
Latin Cup: 1952
Copa Eva Duarte: 1952, 1953
Individual
Ballon d'Or: fifth place 1957

Manager

Málaga

Segunda División: 1987–88

References

External links 

 
 

1927 births
2002 deaths
Footballers from Budapest
Hungarian footballers
Hungarian football managers
Hungarian expatriate football managers
Czechoslovak footballers
Slovak footballers
Spanish footballers
Hungarian expatriate sportspeople in Spain
Czechoslovak expatriate sportspeople in Spain
Hungarian emigrants to Spain
Footballers from Catalonia
La Liga players
La Liga managers
Serie A players
Hungary international footballers
Spain international footballers
Spain national football team managers
Spanish football managers
Real Murcia managers
CD Málaga managers
Ferencvárosi TC footballers
Vasas SC players
Aurora Pro Patria 1919 players
FC Barcelona players
FC Barcelona managers
RCD Espanyol footballers
RCD Espanyol managers
Elche CF managers
ŠK Slovan Bratislava players
1978 FIFA World Cup managers
UEFA Euro 1980 managers
1995 Copa América managers
FC Zürich managers
Czechoslovakia international footballers
Dual internationalists (football)
Hungarian refugees
Catalonia international guest footballers
Hungarian people of Polish descent
Hungarian people of Slovak descent
Hungarians in Slovakia
Al Hilal SFC managers
Paraguay national football team managers
Eastern Canada Professional Soccer League players
Expatriate footballers in Italy
Expatriate footballers in Switzerland
Expatriate soccer players in Canada
Expatriate soccer managers in Canada
Expatriate football managers in Paraguay
Expatriate football managers in Saudi Arabia
Expatriate football managers in Switzerland
North American Soccer League (1968–1984) coaches
National Professional Soccer League (1967) players
Toronto City players
Toronto Falcons (1967–68) players
Association football forwards
Spanish Olympic coaches
Association football coaches
Burials at Les Corts Cemetery